James Fairbairn (born 1872) was an English professional footballer who played as a forward in the Football League for Middlesbrough Ironopolis and Grimsby Town.

References

1872 births
Year of death missing
Footballers from Stockton-on-Tees
English footballers
Association football forwards
Stockton F.C. players
Middlesbrough Ironopolis F.C. players
Grimsby Town F.C. players
English Football League players